Leucosyrinx equatorialis is a species of sea snail, a marine gastropod mollusk in the family Pseudomelatomidae, the turrids and allies.

Description
The length of the shel attains 13.5 mm, its diameter 6 mm.

(Original description) The white shell is rather solid, with about six shouldered whorls. The apex is eroded. The suture is distinct, slightly constricted and appressed. The axial sculpture consists of about 14 rounded ribs nearly reaching the siphonal canal with subequal interspaces. Incremental lines are inconspicuous. The spiral sculpture consists of uniform spiral grooves with wider flattish interspaces, cutting the tops of the ribs. The aperture is short and simple. The inner lip is callous. The short siphonal canal is recurved.

Distribution
This marine species occurs off Ecuador to Southern Chile

References

External links
 

equatorialis
Gastropods described in 1919